The Commission on the Naming of Items of the Department of Defense that Commemorate the Confederate States of America or Any Person Who Served Voluntarily with the Confederate States of America, more commonly referred to as the Naming Commission, was a United States government commission created by the United States Congress in 2021 to create a list of military assets with names associated with the Confederate States of America and recommendations for their removal. 

In the summer of 2020, the George Floyd protests and resulting removal of Confederate monuments drew attention to the U.S. Army installations named for Confederate soldiers. These installations and other defense property were generally named in the early to mid-20th century at the height of the Jim Crow era to court support from Southerners.

In response, lawmakers added a provision for a renaming commission to the William M. (Mac) Thornberry National Defense Authorization Act for Fiscal Year 2021 (NDAA). Enacted on January 1, 2021, the law was passed over President Donald Trump's veto. The law required the commission to develop a list that could be used to "remove all names, symbols, displays, monuments, and paraphernalia that honor or commemorate the Confederate States of America or any person who served voluntarily with the Confederate States of America from all assets of the Department of Defense." The law required the Secretary of Defense to implement the plan within three years of its enactment.

In summer and fall 2022, the commission delivered its report and recommendations to Congress in three parts. It disbanded on October 1, 2022, after fulfilling its duties to Congress. 

On October 6, Secretary of Defense Lloyd Austin declared in a memo that he concurred with all the commission's recommendations and was committed to implementing them as soon as possible, within legal constraints. On 5 January 2023, William A. LaPlante, U.S. under secretary of defense for acquisition and sustainment (USD (A&S)), directed the Department to implement all of the commission's recommendations.

Legislative history 
On June 9, 2020, Sen. Elizabeth Warren (D-MA) announced that she had "filed an amendment to the annual defense bill last week to rename all bases named for Confederate generals." On June 11, 2020, Reps. Anthony Brown (D-MD) and Don Bacon (R-NE) introduced H.R.7155, National Commission on Modernizing Military Installation Designations Act. The bill received support from 30 total co-sponsors, including three Republicans.

The Senate Armed Services Committee (SASC) completed its markup of the FY2021 NDAA on June 11, 2020, and the bill reported out by committee included Warren's provision. Warren's provision to direct the renaming of the bases was altered to an approach that used a commission after Sen. Martha McSally (R-AZ) indicated her support to remove the names. Sens. Mike Rounds (R-SD) and Joni Ernst (R-IA) publicly said that they supported the amendment to change base names.

During consideration of the FY2021 NDAA by the House Armed Services Committee (HASC) on July 1, 2020, Brown offered an amendment, which was co-led with Bacon, to directly require the Secretary of Defense to rename any defense property that is named after any person who served in the political or military leadership of any armed rebellion against the United States. The amendment offered by Brown passed by a vote of 33–23, with Republicans Bacon and Paul Mitchell (R-MI) joining in support. The committee unanimously voted to report the NDAA favorably to the House.

At a July 9, 2020, hearing in HASC, Chairman of the Joint Chiefs of Staff Mark Milley said, “I personally think that the original decisions to name those bases after Confederate bases were political decisions back in the 1910s and ‘20s....The American Civil War was fought, and it was an act of rebellion. It was an act of treason at the time against the Union. Against the stars and stripes. Against the U.S. Constitution. And those officers turned their backs on their oath.”

On November 18, 2020, Speaker Nancy Pelosi named the House Democratic members of the conference committee for the NDAA and in doing so stated that “this summer, the House and Senate on a bipartisan basis passed NDAAs with provisions to begin the process of changing the names of military bases and infrastructure named after individuals who served in the Confederacy. It is imperative that the conference report include provisions that secure this essential priority. Our bases should reflect our highest ideals as Americans.”

Conference negotiations over the provisions were tense and threatened a failure to pass the NDAA for the first time in its 60-year history. On November 20, 2020, the Congressional Black Caucus adopted a formal position that the final conference report for the NDAA "must include a provision mandating the redesignation of Department of Defense property honoring the Confederacy."

On December 2, 2020, the conference committee reported out the conference report, which receded to the Senate language without amendment and incorporated the text as section 370 in the final bill. The House of Representatives agreed to the conference report by a vote of 335–78 on December 8, 2020, and the Senate followed suit on December 11, 2020, passing it 84–13. On December 23, 2020, President Trump vetoed the legislation, saying, "These locations have taken on significance to the American story and those who have helped write it that far transcends their namesakes...I have been clear in my opposition to politically motivated attempts like this to wash away history and to dishonor the immense progress our country has fought for in realizing our founding principles."

On December 28, 2020, in the last vote of the 116th Congress in the House of Representatives, the House voted to override President Trump's veto by 322–87, including 109 Republicans and one Independent who voted yea. On January 1, 2021, in the last vote of the 116th Congress, the Senate voted to override President Trump's veto by 81–13, passing the commission into law. The passage of the FY2021 NDAA was the 60th consecutive time that such legislation had been passed and is the only instance in which it was enacted over the objection of the president.

Activities of the commission 
The commission is chartered with five primary activities:

 Assessing the cost of renaming or removing names, symbols, displays, monuments, or paraphernalia that commemorate the Confederate States of America or any person who served voluntarily with the Confederate States of America.
 Developing procedures and criteria to assess whether an existing name, symbol, monument, display, or paraphernalia commemorates the Confederate States of America or person who served voluntarily with the Confederate States of America.
 Recommending procedures for renaming assets of the Department of Defense to prevent commemoration of the Confederate States of America or any person who served voluntarily with the Confederate States of America.
 Developing a plan to remove names, symbols, displays, monuments, or paraphernalia that commemorate the Confederate States of America or any person who served voluntarily with the Confederate States of America from assets of the Department of Defense, within the timeline established by this Act.
 Including in the plan procedures and criteria for collecting and incorporating local sensitivities associated with naming or renaming of assets of the Department of Defense.

The commission was authorized $2 million to conduct its work, and had to brief the House and Senate Armed Services Committees on its progress by October 1, 2021, and then present a final briefing and written report to the armed services committees by October 1, 2022. The commission met biweekly and briefed the Secretary of Defense on its progress and recommendations. The commission's focus throughout the summer and fall of 2021 comprised visiting the nine Army installations named for those who voluntarily served in the Confederacy. The commission met with installation leadership to gauge their level of planning and their local assessments.

The commission expanded their investigation of military assets to include assets with names that commemorate other Civil War era events or places to see if the name has a connection to the Confederacy. Examples given are USS Antietam (CG-54) and Fort Belvoir.

Until December 1, 2021, the commission had collected suggestions from the general public for possible replacement names for the military assets that the Department of Defense may finally decide to rename. After receiving thousands of suggestions, the commission posted a list of 90 names in March 2022 that it plans to consider as possible replacement names for the nine Army installations before the list is further narrowed to produce the list of finalists.

In March 2022, the commission determined that Fort Belvoir does not meet the criteria provided in the 2021 National Defense Authorization Act for a renaming recommendation but the commission recommends that the Department of Defense conduct its own naming review of the post, based on results of the commission's historical research. At end of the same month, the commission posted a list of 758 Defense Department items at U.S. military installations in the United States, Germany and Japan that has ties to the Confederacy. Many of the items on the list are streets, signs, paintings and buildings. Included on the list, Arlington National Cemetery has a memorial dedicated to Confederate war dead which includes "highly sanitized depictions of slavery".

Members 
The eight-person commission comprises four representatives appointed by the United States Secretary of Defense and one appointee each by the chairmen and ranking members of the Senate Committee on Armed Services and House Committee on Armed Services.

On January 8, 2021, Christopher C. Miller—the acting Defense Secretary for the outgoing Trump administration—appointed the four DoD representatives: "Sean McLean, a White House associate director; Joshua Whitehouse, the White House liaison to the Defense Department who has been involved in some of the post-election purges at the Pentagon; Ann T. Johnston, acting Assistant Secretary of Defense for Legislative Affairs; and Earl G. Matthews, an Army National Guard colonel who previously served as principal deputy general counsel for the Army and on Trump's National Security Council." However, on January 29, 2021, following the inauguration of Joe Biden on January 20, the new administration halted all appointments that had not yet completed paperwork.  This affected the Secretary of Defense's four appointees to the commission. On February 12, 2021, Defense Secretary Lloyd Austin announced new appointments to the position, followed immediately after by the Democratic chairmen and ranking Republicans on the House and Senate Armed Services Committees.

On March 2, it was announced that Smithsonian Secretary Lonnie Bunch had to withdraw from the commission for personal reasons prior to swearing in ceremony. Eight days later, Congressman Smith replaced Bunch with former Obama administration official Lawrence Romo.

Michelle Howard is the chair of the committee with Ty Seidule being the vice-chair. U.S. Army Major General Deborah Kotulich has served as the chief of staff of the Army Support Team to the Naming Commission since November 2021.

Items with Confederate names 
 
Below is a list of U.S. military assets that may be affected by the NDAA:

Army 
 List of U.S. Army installations named for Confederate soldiers
 The United States Military Academy has a dormitory, a road, and an entrance gate that honor alumni who served in the Confederate Army.
 Army National Guard units that can trace their lineage to state militia units that had served as a part of the Confederate Army, such as the 116th Infantry Regiment of the Virginia Army National Guard and the 118th Infantry Regiment of the South Carolina Army National Guard, are allowed under current U.S. Army regulations since 1946 to carry campaign streamers that commemorate Confederate victories over the United States.
 Fort Belvoir was added to the list in May 2021 by the commission since the current name of the base commemorates a slave plantation that previously occupied the site. The base opened in 1917 as Camp A. A. Humphreys, named in honor of union general Andrew A. Humphreys. The fort was renamed in 1935 at the request of Congressman Howard W. Smith (D-VA), an "avowed white supremacist". In March 2022, the commission determined that the fort did not meet the criteria provided in the 2021 NDAA but recommends that the DoD conduct its own naming review of the post.
 Arlington National Cemetery has streets named after Robert E. Lee and Stonewall Jackson, and the Confederate Memorial which includes "highly sanitized depictions of slavery" (dedicated by President Woodrow Wilson on June 4, 1914, the 106th anniversary of the birth of Jefferson Davis).
 Redstone Arsenal has a laboratory named after CSA general Josiah Gorgas.

Navy 
 List of United States Navy ships commemorating the Confederate States of America
 USS Chancellorsville, a ship named for a battle in which a larger Union army was defeated by a much smaller Confederate force. As recently as 2016, the ship's wardroom had a painting of Confederate generals Lee and Jackson.
 USNS Maury, a ship named for an officer in the Confederate navy.
 USS Antietam, a ship named after the Battle of Antietam. Although considered a Union victory, the battle was tactically inconclusive since General George B. McClellan failed to crush the much smaller Confederate force under Robert E. Lee
 The United States Naval Academy has an engineering building (Maury Hall) and the superintendent house (Buchanan House) that honor naval officers who had served in the Confederate Navy.

Air Force
 Fairchild Air Force Base in Spokane, Washington, has a building named after CSA President Jefferson Davis and a street named after Robert E. Lee.

List of recommended base replacement names of March 2022

The commission published in March 2022 the following list of 90 names it considered for use in renaming the nine army bases:

 John Aiso
 Alexander Augusta
 Vernon Baker
 Van Barfoot
 Powhatan Beaty
 Roy Benavidez
 Omar Bradley
 Ruby Bradley
 William Bryant
 Jose Calugas
 William Carney
 Alwyn Cashe
 Richard Cavazos
 Cornelius Charlton
 Charles Chibitty
 Ernest Childers
 Mary Clarke
 Mitchell Red Cloud
 Harold Cohen
 Felix Conde-Falcón
 Courage
 Bruce Crandall & Ed Freeman
 Benjamin Davis, Sr.
 Ernest Dervishian
 Desmond Doss
 Charity Earley
 Dwight Eisenhower
 Marcario García
 James Gavin
 Eduardo Gomez
 Gary Gordon & Randall Shughart
 Arthur Gregg
 Barney Hajiro
 Kimberly Hampton
 Anna Hays
 Rodolfo Hernández
 Robert Howard
 Lawrence Joel
 William Henry Johnson
 Hazel Johnson-Brown
 Charles Kelly
 Mildred Kelly
 Charles Kettles
 Milton Lee
 José López
 John Magrath
 George Marshall
 Frank Merrill
 Jimmie Monteith
 Hal & Julia Moore
 Sadao Munemori
 Audie Murphy
 Michael Novosel, Sr.
 Elsie Ott
 John Page
 Emmett Paige, Jr.
 Frank Peregory
 Emily Perez
 Pascal Poolaw
 Colin Powell
 Ralph Puckett
 Matthew Ridgway
 Ruben Rivers
 Roscoe Robinson, Jr.
 Tibor "Ted" Rubin
 James Rudder
 Alejandro Ruiz
 Benjamin Salomon
 Ruppert Sargent
 Paul Smith
 Donn Starry
 Freddie Stowers
 Jon Swanson
 Central Texas
 Charles Thomas
 Hugh Thompson, Jr.
 Harriet Tubman
 Humberto Versace
 John Vessey, Jr.
 Francis Wai
 Mary Walker
 George Watson
 Homer Wise
 Rodney Yano
 Alvin York
 Charles Young
 Rodger Young

Base renaming recommendations of May 24, 2022

Recommendations:
Fort Moore, currently Fort Benning, in commemoration of Lt. Gen. Hal Moore and Julia Compton Moore
Fort Liberty, currently Fort Bragg, in commemoration of the American value of Liberty. (As the only recommendation of a non-person name, this choice has attracted both criticism and praise in nearby Fayetteville, North Carolina.)
Fort Eisenhower, currently Fort Gordon, in commemoration of General of the Army Dwight D. Eisenhower
Fort Walker, currently Fort A.P. Hill, in commemoration of Dr. Mary Edwards Walker
Fort Cavazos, currently Fort Hood, in commemoration of Gen. Richard E. Cavazos
Fort Gregg-Adams, currently Fort Lee, in commemoration of Lt. Gen. Arthur J. Gregg and Lt. Col. Charity Adams
Fort Barfoot, currently Fort Pickett, in commemoration of Tech. Sgt. Van T. Barfoot
Fort Johnson, currently Fort Polk, in commemoration of Sgt. William Henry Johnson
Fort Novosel, currently Fort Rucker, in commemoration of CW4 Michael J. Novosel

Notes

Medal of Honor recipients

Killed in action

Generals

Other

References

External links 
Final Report to Congress 
 
 
 

United States national commissions
Confederate States of America monuments and memorials